Nicolás Massot is an Argentinian politician and economist. He currently serves as Director of Banco Ciudad de Buenos Aires, Argentina's third-largest public bank. He was a member of the Argentine Chamber of Deputies (lower house of the Argentine legislature) from 2015 to 2019.

Career 
He began his career as the General Director of Political and Institutional Reform under then-president Cristina Fernández de Kirchner. He served in that role until de Krichner's 2015 term ended. He then was elected a Deputy of the Argentine Nation for the Province of Córdoba, serving from December 2015 through December 2019. During his time in the legislature, he was replaced Federico Pinedo as President of the Legislative Bloc of the PRO.

He has also worked for Argentina's Ministry of the Interior.

Massot has been married to Chiara Comoretto since 2017. The couple met in Argentina's National Congress. He received a degree in economics from the Universidad Torcuato di Tella.

Massot is currently preparing to contest the 2023 mayoral race in Tigre, where he has lived and served with the military for two years.

Honors 
In 2019, Massot was named one of Yale University's World Fellows.

References

Members of the Argentine Chamber of Deputies elected in Córdoba
Argentine economists
Argentine politicians
Living people
Year of birth missing (living people)